Shazia Parveen (born-1990s) from Vehari, Punjab is the first female firefighter in Pakistan. She joined rescue 1122 emergency services in 2010. She has received nationwide recognition and has been featured in international news as well.

Personal life 
Parveen lives in Karampur with eight family members. She joined the rescue services in 2010 when the fire department announced its first women department. Parveen joined the program along with 600 other people. She was trained at Punjab Emergency Services, Lahore and she was the only woman who completed the training. According to Parveen, she chose the profession by choice and had the support of her late father, Rehmat Ullah; a former army personnel. She said she and her siblings were brought up to help people so she joined the rescue services. She said she was inspired to continue her training because she was told she would become the first lady firefighter in Asia.

Career 
Parveen, who was 22 at the time, joined the rescue services in 2010 and started work after completing her seven months of  training. Parveen started her work at the Vehari Fire Department where she has taken part in many expeditions. Her tasks involved extinguishing fires in factories and homes, mostly electrical fires. Parveen worked for six years at the Vehari Fire Department.

In 2016, Parveen was promoted to lead fire instructor at the Vehari Fire department. She was later transferred to the Thokar Niaz Baig Rescue Department of Lahore where she was appointed as a trainer. She trained new members on standard operating procedures at the Punjab Emergency services Department. She has trained women cadets on extinguishing fires and boys and girls at a department that has received more than 1000 new recruits.

Parveen was also featured in the book, Pakistan for Women by Maleeha Abidi. The book features some of Pakistan's most notable women and has received recognition nationally and internationally.

Awards 

 CCBPL award 2015

See also 

 Women in Pakistan

References

External links 
 
 

Living people
1990 births
Pakistani firefighters
Women in firefighting
People from Vehari